Agasanahalli may refer to places in India:
 Agasanahalli (Bhadravati), Shimoga District, Karnataka
 Agasanahalli (Dharwad), Dharwad District, Karnataka
 Agasanahalli (Jagalur), Davanagere District, Karnataka
 Agasanahalli (Sorab), Shimoga District, Karnataka